Brookesia desperata is a species of chameleons. It is endemic to Foret d'Ambre Special Reserve in north Madagascar, and is a critically endangered species due to the decline of its habitat. This decline is attributed to clearance of forest for crops, charcoal production, timber extraction, small-scale quarrying and cattle grazing. It was named desperata to provoke thought regarding the desperately threatened habitat of Madagascar's micro-endemic species. B. Desperata was discovered in 2012 by a research team led by Dr. Frank Glaw from the Zoologische Staatssammlung München.

References

desperata
Critically endangered fauna of Africa
Endemic fauna of Madagascar
Reptiles of Madagascar
Reptiles described in 2012
Taxa named by Frank Glaw
Taxa named by Jörn Köhler
Taxa named by Miguel Vences